The Indian Journal of Plastic Surgery is a peer-reviewed open access medical journal published by  Medknow Publications on behalf of the Association of Plastic Surgeons of India. It covers research on all aspects of aesthetic plastic surgery.

Abstracting and indexing 
The journal is abstracted and indexed in EBSCO Databases, Expanded Academic ASAP, ProQuest, PubMed, PubMed Central, and Scopus.

External links 
 

Open access journals
English-language journals
Biannual journals
Surgery journals
Plastic surgery
Healthcare in India
Medknow Publications academic journals